The National Highway 80 or the N-80 is one of Pakistan National Highway running from Capital city of Islamabad to the city of Kohat in Khyber Pakhtunkhwa Province via Fateh Jang and Jand Its total length is 146 km divided into 121 km section in Punjab Province and remaining 49 km in Khyber Pakhtunkhwa Province. It is maintained and operated by Pakistan's National Highway Authority.

See also

References

External links
 National Highway Authority

Roads in Pakistan